Bully for you may refer to:

Television
"Bully for You", a 2001 episode of CSI: Crime Scene Investigation
"Bully for You!", a 1989 episode of The Raccoons

Songs
"Bully for You", a song by Tom Robinson Band from the 1979 album TRB Two